Matthew or Matt Knowles may refer to:

Matt Knowles (born 1974), professional wrestler
Matt Knowles (soccer) (born 1970), soccer player
Matt Knowles (rugby league) (born 1975), rugby league footballer
Matt William Knowles (born 1985), actor
Mathew Knowles (born 1952), record executive, father of Beyoncé Knowles